Notocrater ponderi is a species of small sea snail, a marine gastropod mollusk in the family Pseudococculinidae, the false limpets.

Distribution
This marine species occurs off New South Wales, Australia and in the Tasman Sea.

References

External links
 To USNM Invertebrate Zoology Mollusca Collection
 To World Register of Marine Species
 Marshall, B. A. (1986). Recent and Tertiary Cocculinidae and Pseudococculinidae (Mollusca: Gastropoda) from New Zealand and New South Wales. New Zealand Journal of Zoology. 12(4): 505-546

Pseudococculinidae
Gastropods described in 1986